Kamala Lopez is an American filmmaker, actress, writer, director, and political activist. She has had starring roles in Black Jesus, Medium, 24, Alias, NYPD Blue, Hill Street Blues, Miami Vice, and 21 Jump Street.  She has been a featured actress in films including Born in East L.A., Deep Cover, The Burning Season, Clear and Present Danger, Lightning Jack, and I Heart Huckabees.

As a filmmaker, her feature film debut, A Single Woman, about the life of first US Congresswoman Jeannette Rankin, won the 2009 Exceptional Merit in Media Award from the National Women's Political Caucus. In 2013, her short Spanish-language film Ese Beso won the Jury Award at the Senorita Cinema Festival and the Audience Award at the Boyle Heights Latina Film Festival.  In 2016, her follow-up feature, the documentary Equal Means Equal, won Best U.S. Documentary (Audience Award) at Michael Moores TCF Festival, and was a New York Times Critics' Pick. The film was the catalyst behind a national civil rights movement pushing for the ratification of the 28th Amendment to the United States Constitution: the Equal Rights Amendment.

Early life
Lopez was born in New York City and raised in Caracas, Venezuela. 

She attended Yale University, graduating with a bachelor's degree in philosophy and theater studies.

Career
Lopez has worked as an actor in more than thirty feature films, including I Heart Huckabees (2004), Born in East L.A. (1987), Deep Cover (1992), and The Burning Season (1994); and more than seventy television shows, including 21 Jump Street, Lie To Me, Alias, Star Trek: Voyager, NYPD Blue, and It's Garry Shandling's Show.

In 2007 Lopez hosted Wired Science on PBS, a production of KCET Los Angeles in association with Wired, along with comedian Chris Hardwick.

Lopez directed the Spanish-language short film Ese Beso in Madrid, Spain, starring Daniel Freire and Lia Chapman. She directed A Single Woman (2008), about the life of the first US congresswoman, Jeannette Rankin. The film was adapted from the play of the same name, written by Jeanmarie Simpson, a relative of Lopez.

Lopez produced the new media series Speechless Without Writers with director George Hickenlooper during the Writers Guild of America strike of 2007.

Political activism
In 2009 Lopez created the ERA Education Project, a national media campaign to raise awareness about the Equal Rights Amendment in the United States. She interviewed women nationwide about how civil rights issues such as equal pay and domestic violence affect their daily lives.

In October 2013, she launched a Kickstarter campaign for the documentary Equal Means Equal. This project about the status of women in America also meant to revive public support for the ERA. Gloria Steinem appears in the film, along with more than 100 interviewees.

Lopez blogs for The Huffington Post.

Awards and recognition
2019 - YaleWomen Impact Award for Excellence
2016 - Champion of Justice - National Civil Rights Group Equal Rights Advocates
 2016 - Best U.S Documentary Audience Award - Traverse City Film Festival
 2016 - Latino Spirit Award for Achievement in Advocacy and Entertainment - State of California
 2015 - Woman of the Year Award - Los Angeles County Board of Supervisors and the Women's Commission
 2013  - Jury Award - Senorita Cinema Festival
 2013 -  Audience Award - Boyle Heights Latina Film Festival
 2012 -  Named one of the 21 Leaders for the 21st Century by Women's eNews
 2011 - Woman of Courage Award from the National Women's Political Caucus
 2009 - Retrospective for Work as an Actor and Director - Museum of Latin American Art
 2009 -  Exceptional Merit Media Award for A "Single Woman" - National Women's Political Caucus

Filmography

Film

Television

See also
 List of female film and television directors

References

External links
 

Living people
20th-century American actresses
21st-century American actresses
21st-century American women writers
American film actresses
American film directors
American television actresses
American women film directors
American women film producers
American women screenwriters
American women columnists
Actresses from New York City
American actresses of Indian descent
American people of Venezuelan descent
Venezuelan people of Indian descent
HuffPost writers and columnists
Year of birth missing (living people)